ONC may refer to:

Places

 Old North Church, Boston, US
 Old North Church (Sierra Madre, California), US

Science and technology
 Ocean Networks Canada, a University of Victoria initiative
 Octanitrocubane, an explosive
 Oncidium (Onc.), an orchid genus
 Open Network Computing, a remote procedure call system
 Operational Navigation Chart, the basis of the Digital Chart of the World
 Ordinary National Certificate
 Orthopaedic Nurse Certified

Organizations
 Office of the National Coordinator for Health Information Technology
 Oficiul Naţional Cinematografic, an agency in Romanian cinema
 Olivet Nazarene College or Olivet Nazarene University